Dhone Junction railway station (station code: DHNE) is the primary railway station serving Dhone in Andhra Pradesh, India. The station comes under the jurisdiction of Guntakal division of South Coast Railways. It is a biggest railway junction in Kurnool district, Andhra Pradesh. The station has three platforms. The station is situated at junction of three lines branching towards Guntur, Kacheguda and Guntakal.

Classification 

Dhone Junction railway station is classified as a B–category station in the Guntakal railway division.

Trains passing through Dhone junction

References 

Guntakal
Railway junction stations in Andhra Pradesh
Railway stations in Kurnool district